Einar Larsen may refer to:

 Einar Bruno Larsen (1939–2021), Norwegian footballer and ice hockey player
 Einar Larsen (footballer, born 1904) (1904–1977), Norwegian footballer
 Einar Larsen (Danish footballer) (1900–1981)